Jared Graves (born  16 December 1982 in Toowoomba, Queensland) is an Australian cyclist who has represented Australia in BMX, four-cross (4X), and downhill mountain biking. In 2006, he finished second in the mountain bike 4x world cup series. In 2008 he finished second in the BMX world cup series and was selected to compete at the 2008 Summer Olympics in Beijing, where he finished sixth.

Graves became 4X World Cup champion in 2009, winning 5 from 8 rounds. On 4 September 2009 he won the UCI 4X World Championship in Canberra, Australia. He won the 2010 UCI 4X World Cup series winning 4 from 6 rounds, then won the silver medal at the 2010 4X World Championships At Mont-Sainte-Anne, Canada after leading the final all the way until making a mistake and being passed on the final corner. Graves also won the 2011 4X World Cup title winning 3 from 5 Rounds. Graves rides for Yeti Cycles. Graves is widely regarded as the best four-cross racer of all time.

Graves has turned his focus to the fastest growing discipline and arguably the discipline enjoying the most popularity in mountain bike racing for 2013, enduro. He has had a strong start to the season with wins at the traditional international season opening event, the Sea Otter Classic in California. He has finished top at almost all the 2013 Enduro World Series events, including a win at round 5 of the series during the Whistler Crankworx festival, and has finished the season as the number 2 ranked enduro racer in the world. He then jumped back into downhill racing at the end of the season went on to place 3rd at the UCI Mountain Bike & Trials World Championships in Pietermaritzburg, South Africa.

In 2014 Graves won 3 of the 7 rounds of the Enduro World Series (Valloire, France, round 3 -  Winter Park, USA, round 5 -  and whistler, Canada, round 6) as well as 2 second-place finishes (round 1 and 7), a 5th (round 4) and a 9th (round 2) to become the 2014 Enduro World Champion.

In December 2015 it was announced that Graves would join the Specialized Racing Factory Enduro Team for 2016.

References

 Australian Olympic Committee profile

External links
 
 
 
 
 

1982 births
Living people
Australian male cyclists
Four-cross mountain bikers
BMX riders
UCI Mountain Bike World Champions (men)
Olympic cyclists of Australia
Cyclists at the 2008 Summer Olympics
Cyclists from Queensland